Anne Carter may refer to:

 Anne Laurel Carter (born 1953), Canadian author
 Anne Carter (economist) (born 1925), American academic and economist
 Anne Carter (translator)

See also
 Ann Carter, child actress
 Ann Shaw Carter, American helicopter pilot